WNFB (94.3 FM, "Mix 94.3") is a classic hits–formatted radio station licensed to Lake City, Florida, United States. The station is owned by Newman Media, Inc. as part of a duopoly with News Talk Information station WDSR (1340 AM). Both stations are operated by Southern Stone Communications under a local marketing agreement.

The station maintains transmission facilities along County Road 49 in rural southeastern Suwannee County east of McAlpin.

History

WNFB, along with sister station WDSR, was acquired by John Newman in 1998. He died in 2015; however, the station remains under ownership of the family via a trust.

On December 26, 2022, WNFB swapped formats with WCJX (106.5 FM). WNFB's previous Hot adult contemporary format as Mix 94.3 moved to WCJX, while WNFB inherited 106.5's classic hits format along with The Lake branding.

Programming
Syndicated programming heard on WNFB include The Bob and Sheri Show.

References

External links

NFB
Classic hits radio stations in the United States
Lake City, Florida